Morna is a Slovak progressive death metal band founded in 2010 by Michal Vlkovic, Jakub Filip and Robert Ruman. In summer of 2011, Tomas Cvecka, the last missing person, joined Morna as a full-time bass guitarist. In May 2013 the band has released studio album, debut called A Tale Of Woe. Morna is mainly distinctive for its ability to combine varied kind of elements and influences such as melodiousness, progressivity, use of acoustic guitar parts and heavy riffs, death growls and clean vocals and classical hard rock, progressive rock and blues influences.

In February 2014, the debut album A Tale Of Woe was nominated in category Hard and Heavy for Record of the year of 2013 in Radio Head Awards.

In May 2015 the band announced it is gearing up for recording the second full-length studio album. Recording started in July 2015 and continued to the end of November at the same year. In the same month, on 13 November, Morna posted an announcement about the title of the album via its official Facebook page. This album is called Nuisance. Track listing of Nuisance came in the same month as another revealing fact the band has announced to its followers.

With the second full-length studio album, Morna had a nomination in Radio Head Awards 2015 for the Record of the Year. The band has won the award for its work on Nuisance (2015), in category Hard & Heavy. To this date, Morna has been nominated second time in a row for this award and this is its first win. Radio_Head Awards ceremony took place at Stara trznica in Bratislava, on 13th of march of 2016.

Discography

Studio albums
A Tale Of Woe (2013)
Nuisance (2015)

Awards and nominations
Radio Head Awards

|-
| align="center"| 2014
| A Tale of Woe
| Best Hard & Heavy Record
| 
|-
| align="center"| 2016
| Nuisance
| Best Hard & Heavy Record
|

References

External links

 

Musical groups established in 2010
Slovak heavy metal musical groups
Death metal musical groups
2010 establishments in Slovakia